Christians in the Gambia constitute approximately 3 percent (~136,400) of the country's population (1,705,000 – 2009 est.)

The government has not established a state religion, but the predominant religion is Islam, practised by approximately 90% of the country's population. Article 25 of the Constitution protects the rights of citizens to practise any religion that they choose.

The Christian community, situated mostly in the west and south of the country, is predominantly Roman Catholic; there are also several Protestant groups including Anglicans, Methodists, Baptists, Seventh-day Adventists, and various small evangelical denominations. In 1965, the Gambia Christian Council was formed as an ecumenical association of Roman Catholic, Anglican, and Methodist churches.

Intermarriage between Muslims and Christians is common. In some areas, Islam and Christianity are syncretized with animism.

Roman Catholicism

In 1931 from the Apostolic Vicariate of Senegambia was established Mission “sui iuris” of Gambia. In 1951 Mission was promoted as the Apostolic Prefecture of Bathurst, in 1957 promoted as Diocese of Bathurst in Gambia (renamed in 1974 as Diocese of Banjul).

Now there are about 42,400 (~2.4%) Catholics in the Gambia. The Diocese of Banjul is divided into 56 parishes.

Bishop James Allen Yaw Odico is the present Catholic Bishop of the diocese of Banjul.

Anglicanism
The Anglican Diocese of Gambia and the Rio Pongas was founded in 1935. John Daly was the first bishop of the new diocese. In 1951 five West African Anglican dioceses, including the Diocese of Gambia, were formed into the Church of the Province of West Africa. In 1985 from the Diocese of Gambia was separated the Diocese of Guinea and now the jurisdiction of Anglican Diocese of Gambia comprises the Republics of the Gambia, Senegal, and Cape Verde.

In 2000 the Church of the Province of West Africa adopted legislation permitting women priests, but only Liberia and the Gambia have passed enabling legislation and ordained women clergy.

Solomon Tilewa Johnson, who died in 2014, was the first Gambian national to hold the post of Anglican Bishop of Gambia.

See also

Religion in the Gambia
Islam in the Gambia

References

External links

The Catholic Diocese of Banjul
Anglican Diocese of Gambia